Alfonso de Jesús Hinojosa Berrones (October 7, 1924 – February 23, 2017) was a Catholic bishop.

Ordained to the priesthood in 1949, Hinojosa Berrones served as bishop of the Diocese of Ciudad Victoria, Mexico, from 1974 to 1985. He then served as auxiliary bishop of the Roman Catholic Archdiocese of Monterey from 1985 to 2000.

Notes

1924 births
2017 deaths
20th-century Roman Catholic bishops in Mexico